United Nations Security Council Resolution 370, adopted on June 13, 1975, extended the stationing of the United Nations Peacekeeping Force in Cyprus for another 6 months until December 15, 1975.  This extension occurred in the wake of the Turkish invasion of Cyprus, and the Council urged the Secretary-General to continue the mission of good offices that was entrusted to him by resolution 367 and submit an interim report to them by September 15 and a definitive one no later than December 15.

The resolution was adopted by 14 votes to none, while the People's Republic of China did not participate in the vote.

See also
 Cyprus dispute
 List of United Nations Security Council Resolutions 301 to 400 (1971–1976)
 Turkish Invasion of Cyprus

References
Text of the Resolution at UN.org

External links
 

 0370
 0370
June 1975 events